Billie Rose Prichard is an Australian actress on stage and screen, and a hip-hop musician. She was nominated for Best Supporting Actress in the 2011 Sydney Theatre Awards.

Career

Acting 
Prichard has appeared on film and television since 1999. She had guest character roles in the Australian TV series Wildside, Water Rats, The Secret Life of Us, and All Saints. In 2008, she appeared as one of five friends who venture into the remote Blue Mountains in the film Monkey Puzzle, later released in the US as Enter the Wild (2018). 
Her stage roles have attracted critical acclaim. In 2006, she played the young daughter of a titled lady in pre-Federation northern Queensland in Constance Drinkwater. A reviewer wrote "Prichard [and the actor playing her sister] work with great rapport to create characters that defy easy description. Nine-year-olds who have glimpsed the 20th century and know how it ends, who commune with spirits and wrestle with men, are made coherent and nuanced by these talented young actors." In 2011, she appeared in Belvoir St Theatre’s The Dark Room, about which critics wrote "Billie Rose Pritchard is electric as the adolescent, very much on the edge"; "Billie Rose Prichard is superb as the bruised and troubled Grace: sullenly uncommunicative, aggressively defiant, but then suddenly sometimes heart-achingly vulnerable." She was nominated for Best Supporting Actress in the 2011 Sydney Theatre Awards for her performance in this role. In 2018, she appeared in The Hayes Theatre's revival of the musical Darlinghurst Nights. One reviewer commented "Cora, an ex-hooker [was] luminously played by the stunning Billie Rose Prichard".

Music 
As Billie Rose, Prichard is the vocalist with hip-hop group The Daily Meds. The group released their debut album Happy Daze in, followed in 2014 by an album titled Sour Milk. A reviewer said about Sour Milk, "Vocalist Billie Rose seamlessly complements the hard hitting nature of the record without coming across as passive. For Rose there is no hiding behind a big beat or wailing in the background, it’s her straight up, candid choruses that cut the album up and give it different dimensions".

Selected filmography

Film 
 Me, Myself, I (1999)
 The Silence (2006)
 Monkey Puzzle (2008)
 X: Night of (Vengeance) (2011)
 The Egg (2013)
 Skin Deep (2015)
 Midnight Poetry (2014)
 Enter the Wild (2018)

Television 
 Wildside (1999) - Season 2, Episode 7
 Water Rats (2000) - Season 5, Episode 24
 The Secret Life of Us (2003) - Season 3, Episode 14
 All Saints (2003) - Season 6, Episode 41
 Love Bytes (2013 internet TV series)

Selected stage performances 
 Constance Drinkwater (2006)
 A Midsummer Night's Dream 
 The Dark Room by Angela Betzien (2011)
 Darlinghurst Nights (2018)

References

External links 

Year of birth missing (living people)
Living people
21st-century Australian actresses
Australian musicians